Frank A. Serafini (born February 15, 1945) is a former Republican member of the Pennsylvania House of Representatives. He was sworn in to represent the 114th legislative district in the Pennsylvania House of Representatives in 1979.

Biography
In 1999, Serafini was convicted of federal perjury charges for lying in his federal grand jury testimony regarding a scheme involving his nephew to funnel $129,000 in illegal campaign contributions to 10 political candidates. 

After his conviction, he delayed resigning his seat, as was required by the Pennsylvania Constitution, in order to extend a 103-100 Republican majority in the House. He eventually resigned his seat on February 7, 2000.

References

Republican Party members of the Pennsylvania House of Representatives
Living people
1945 births
People from Lackawanna County, Pennsylvania
American perjurers
Pennsylvania politicians convicted of crimes